is a railway station located in Uji, Kyoto Prefecture, Japan, operated by West Japan Railway Company (JR West). It has the station number "JR-D07".

Lines
Kohata Station is served by the Nara Line.

Layout
The station has two side platforms serving one track each.

Platform

History
	
Station numbering was introduced in March 2018 with Kohata being assigned station number JR-D07.

Passenger statistics
According to the Kyoto Prefecture statistical report, the average number of passengers per day is as follows.

Surrounding area
 Panasonic Electronic Devices Co., Ltd. (Capacitor Business Unit)
 Kohata Shrine
 Kyoto Animation (head office)
 Kowata Station on the Keihan Railway Uji Line

References

External links

  

Railway stations in Kyoto Prefecture